City of Colorado Springs Municipal Airport , known as Colorado Springs Airport, is a city-owned public civil-military airport  southeast of downtown Colorado Springs, in El Paso County, Colorado, United States. It is the second busiest commercial service airport in the state after Denver International Airport. Peterson Space Force Base, which is located on the north side of runway 13/31, is a tenant of the airport.

History

For the first ten years several small airlines operated a mail route from Cheyenne, Wyoming to Pueblo, Colorado with stops at Denver and Colorado Springs. These airlines only occasionally carried passengers. In 1937, Continental Airlines began service between Denver and El Paso, Texas with stops at Colorado Springs, Pueblo, Las Vegas, New Mexico, Santa Fe, and Albuquerque. In 1943 Braniff Airways began service on a Denver-Colorado Springs-Pueblo-Amarillo route. At Amarillo, flights would continue onto Dallas and Houston or onto Oklahoma City, Tulsa, Little Rock, and Memphis. The first municipal terminal was built in 1942 in an art deco style. Soon after the terminal was built the field was taken over by the military in the months preceding World War II. After the war, the city regained control.

In 1966 a new terminal was built on the west side of the runways, just east of Powers Boulevard. This terminal expanded by the 1980s, with a six gate addition. In 1991 the city approved a new terminal, two miles east of the former terminal, in the south-center part of the airport. The  terminal opened on October 22, 1994 with 12 gates; it was designed by the Van Sant Group and cost $140 million. In the 1990s a second, five-gate concourse was added on the east side of the main terminal.

In 1996, the 1941 passenger terminal, two hangars, and a caretaker residence — by that time all located on Peterson Air Force Base — were inscribed on the National Register of Historic Places. They form the campus of the Peterson Air and Space Museum.

From the 1980s to the present day, the airport has tried to expand service. The largest number of passengers was nearly 5 million in 1996 when now-defunct Western Pacific Airlines had a hub at COS (Western Pacific moved the hub to Denver International Airport in late 1996). Their timetable for 15 June shows 33 daily departures to 20 airports between the west coast and Newark and Washington Dulles. Frontier Airlines added and dropped various routes from Colorado Springs throughout the 2010s. Southwest Airlines announced in October 2020 that they would begin serving the airport in 2021. Southwest conducted their first flights in March 2021, which has since bolstered the airport's commercial traffic.

In May 2021, the airport began a pavement rehabilitation project, closing runway 17R/35L for remodeling. The upgrades include new asphalt, lighting, and navigation equipment. The airport announced in November 2021 that the main concourse (gates 1–12) will undergo a $10–$20 million renovation and will be completed in 3 to 5 years. The concourse was completed in 1994 and has not been renovated since then. The design has become outdated, prompting airport officials to renovate. On March 1, officials announced that COS will receive a $6 million grant to complete the planned renovation. Construction will start in the summer of 2023.

In March 2022, the Colorado Springs Airport released a plan to expand the airport, with plans to double the number of gates from 12 to 24, relocate the control tower, and consolidate other airport services.

Facilities

Location and access 
The airport is located on the east side of Colorado Springs, accessible by Milton E. Proby Parkway via Powers Boulevard/SH 21. Milton E. Proby Parkway loops through the airport running north to the terminal, with exits to long and short term parking and rental car return, and eventually splits into an upper departures drop-off area and lower arrivals pick-up area east of the terminal. The road converges again on the west side of the terminal and runs south, joined by access roads, parking lot exits, and rental car exits. There is also an exit to return to the terminal via the northbound airport entrance.

Milton E. Proby Parkway also provides access to other airport facilities and tenants, including a Northrop Grumman building and an Amazon distribution center via Peak Innovation Parkway.

Powers Boulevard/SH 21, a primary expressway in El Paso County, runs west of the airport and provides easy access to general and private aviation hangars, maintenance facilities (including the SkyWest hangar), and FBOs (Cutter Aviation, jetCenter, and the J.H.W. Hangar Complex). The expressway also provides North-South access to the Colorado Springs and Falcon (via Highway 24) region.

Terminal and gate information
Colorado Springs Airport has one terminal with two concourses. However, only one, the larger concourse housing gates 1–12, has ever been put to commercial use; the second concourse (called the Western Pacific Airlines concourse) contains gates 14–18 (there is no gate 13) and is now mainly used for meetings. Access between the concourses requires leaving the secure area, walking through the main terminal and down a long hallway. There is no public access to these gates. With the announcement of the addition of 12 gates onto the existing terminal, the airport plans to demolish gates 14–18, as they are nearing the end of their useful life.

Transportation

Shuttles and buses 
The airport is serviced by Colorado Springs' public transportation system, Mountain Metropolitan Transit. Service from private transportation, such as Groome Transportation, is also available.

Rental vehicles 
Alamo, Avis, Budget, Dollar, Enterprise, Hertz, and National Car Rental provide on-airport car rentals. The rental car check in counters are located on the lower level outside of the secured area, across from baggage claim.

Airlines and destinations

Passenger

Cargo

Statistics

Annual traffic

Top destinations

Airline market share

Accidents and incidents 
On March 3, 1991, United Airlines Flight 585, a Boeing 737-291 flying from Peoria, Illinois, to Colorado Springs via Denver, crashed on final approach to Colorado Springs Runway 35 after a rudder malfunction caused the aircraft to roll over and dive, killing all 25 on board.
On December 21, 1997, a Beechcraft King Air operated by Aviation Charter flying in from Minneapolis St. Paul International Airport impacted terrain at Colorado Springs Airport in fog during a missed instrument landing system (ILS) approach. Both passengers on board were Northwest Airlines mechanics being flown in to repair a Northwest Airlines aircraft at COS. The pilot and one passenger were killed; the other passenger sustained serious injuries.
On April 16, 2018, a fire broke out on the airport's roof. There were no casualties, but the event resulted in the airport being closed for a single day.

See also

 List of airports in Colorado

References

External links 
Official airport website
Colorado Springs Municipal Airport at Colorado DOT website

Flight path in Colorado Springs 

Airports in Colorado
Transportation in Colorado Springs, Colorado
Buildings and structures in Colorado Springs, Colorado
Tourism in Colorado Springs, Colorado
1927 establishments in Colorado
Airports established in 1927
Government buildings completed in 1942
History of Colorado Springs, Colorado
Military history of El Paso County, Colorado
Transportation buildings and structures in El Paso County, Colorado